The unrelated corrugated frog (Limnonectes laticeps) of Southeast Asia is occasionally also called "flat-headed frog".

The flat-headed frog (Limnodynastes depressus) is a species of frog in the family Limnodynastidae.
It is endemic to Australia.
Its natural habitats are subtropical and tropical dry lowland grassland and freshwater marshes.
It is threatened by habitat loss.

References

Limnodynastes
Amphibians of Western Australia
Amphibians of the Northern Territory
Amphibians described in 1976
Taxonomy articles created by Polbot
Frogs of Australia